Joel Fluellen (December 1, 1907 – February 2, 1990) was an actor and an activist for the rights of African Americans. He appeared in the films The Jackie Robinson Story, Perils of the Jungle, Duffy of San Quentin, Sitting Bull, Friendly Persuasion, Monster from Green Hell, The Decks Ran Red, Porgy and Bess, A Raisin in the Sun, He Rides Tall, Roustabout, The Chase, The Learning Tree, The Great White Hope, Skin Game, Thomasine & Bushrod, The Bingo Long Traveling All-Stars & Motor Kings, Casey's Shadow and Butch and Sundance: The Early Days, among others.

Cinema career

After getting a series of small roles, Fluellen attracted attention playing the role of Jackie Robinson's brother in The Jackie Robinson Story, released in 1950. Other significant roles followed in movies such as Friendly Persuasion, The Learning Tree and The Great White Hope.

He also appeared in television series, including The Dick Van Dyke Show and Hill Street Blues.

Activism
Following calls by the National Association for the Advancement of Colored People against the stereotyping of African Americans in the film industry, Fluellen tried to get the Screen Actors Guild to protect their Black members against discrimination. The guild, headed by Ronald Reagan at the time, repeatedly rebuffed his resolutions, and Fluellen became an early member of the Negro Actors Guild of America. 

With Frances Williams, he received the first Paul Robeson Pioneer Awards from the Black American Cinema Society, in 1985.

Later life
Fluellen was gay. He suffered health problems and was becoming blind toward the end of his life. He shot and killed himself on February 2, 1990, at his home in Los Angeles, California.

Selected filmography

Dark Manhattan (1937) - Henchman (uncredited)
Spirit of Youth (1938) - Kitchen Worker (uncredited)
The Duke Is Tops (1938) - Tonic Customer (uncredited)
Congo Maisie (1940) - Native (uncredited)
While Thousands Cheer (1940) - Waiter (uncredited)
The Flame of New Orleans (1941) - Servant (uncredited)
Heart of the Golden West (1942) - Member - Hall Johnson Choir (uncredited)
Happy Go Lucky (1943) - Trinidad Native (uncredited)
Cabin in the Sky (1943) - Mr. Kelso / Jim Henry's Paradise Patron (uncredited)
Hit the Ice (1943) - Club Car Bartender (uncredited)
I Dood It (1943) - Member of Hazel Scott's Group (uncredited)
Jungle Queen (1945, Serial) - Native (uncredited)
Shady Lady (1945) - Dining Car Waiter (uncredited)
White Pongo (1945) - Mumbo Jumbo
This Love of Ours (1945) - Porter (uncredited)
 The Negro Sailor (1945)
Without Reservations (1946) - Club Car Waiter (uncredited)
Two Guys from Milwaukee (1946) - Porter (uncredited)
The Burning Cross (1947) - Charlie West
Family Honeymoon (1948) - Waiter (uncredited)
Sun Tan Ranch (1948)
No Time for Romance (1948) - Drums Miller
Mighty Joe Young (1949) - Tall Native (uncredited)
Rope of Sand (1949) - Native (uncredited)
Buccaneer's Girl (1950) - Black Man in Marketplace (uncredited)
The Jackie Robinson Story (1950) - Mack Robinson
The Great Jewel Robber (1950) - Train Waiter (uncredited)
Walk Softly, Stranger (1950) - Florist (uncredited)
You're in the Navy Now (1951) - Officer's Club Waiter (uncredited)
Tarzan's Peril (1951) - Attendant (uncredited)
His Kind of Woman (1951) - Sam (uncredited)
Lydia Bailey (1952) - Toussant's Aide (uncredited)
Affair in Trinidad (1952) - Jeffrey Mabetes - Fisherman (uncredited)
Jungle Drums of Africa (1953, Serial) - Matambo, Native Searcher [Ch.4]
Perils of the Jungle (1953) - Kenny
The Moonlighter (1953) - Black Man in Jail Cell (uncredited)
The Royal African Rifles (1953) - Soldier
Duffy of San Quentin (1954) - Bill Lake
Riot in Cell Block 11 (1954) - Al
Jungle Gents (1954) - Rangori - Witch Doctor (uncredited)
Sitting Bull (1954) - Sam
Seven Angry Men (1955) - Heyward - Harper's Ferry Station Master (uncredited)
Lord of the Jungle (1955) - Molu (uncredited)
Lucy Gallant (1955) - Summertime (uncredited)
I'll Cry Tomorrow (1955) - The Porter (uncredited)
Friendly Persuasion (1956) - Enoch
The Opposite Sex (1956) - Club Car Bartender (uncredited)
Oh, Men! Oh, Women! (1957) - Cab Driver (uncredited)
Monster from Green Hell (1957) - Arobi
House of Numbers (1957) - Ashlow - Convict (uncredited)
Run Silent, Run Deep (1958) - Bragg (uncredited)
The Decks Ran Red (1958) - Pete
Imitation of Life (1959) - Minister
Porgy and Bess (1959) - Robbins
The Young Savages (1961) - Court Clerk (uncredited)
A Raisin in the Sun (1961) - Bobo
He Rides Tall (1964) - Dr. Sam
Good Neighbor Sam (1964) - Judge (uncredited)
Roustabout (1964) - Cody Marsh
The Chase (1966) - Lester Johnson
Who's Minding the Mint? (1967) - Policeman (uncredited)
Hang 'Em High (1968) - Williams (uncredited)
Uptight (1968) - Kyle's associate (uncredited)
The Learning Tree (1969) - Uncle Rob
The Great White Hope (1970) - Tick
Skin Game (1971) - Abram
Colombo (Columbo) - serie TV, episodio 1x05 (1971)
Ace Eli and Rodger of the Skies (1973) - Handyman (uncredited)
Thomasine & Bushrod (1974) - Nathaniel
Man Friday (1975) - Doctor
The Bingo Long Traveling All-Stars & Motor Kings (1976) - Mr. Holland
Casey's Shadow (1978) - Jimmy Judson
Butch and Sundance: The Early Days (1979) - Jack the Bartender

References

External links

 

1907 births
1990 deaths
20th-century American male actors
American male film actors
Suicides by firearm in California
1990 suicides
American male television actors
People from Monroe, Louisiana
Male actors from Louisiana